Lisa Therese Hegertun Wiik (born 5 October 1979) is a Norwegian snowboarder from Trondheim.

Career
Wilk began competing on the Swatch TTR Tour in 1996. She finished tenth in the half pipe at the 2002 Winter Olympics. In 2008, she finished 11th on the Swatch TTR Ticket to Ride (World Snowboard Tour). In 2009, she finished 2nd on the Swatch TTR Ticket to Ride (World Snowboard Tour).

Competition Results
Swatch TTR 2008/2009 Season
1st - Slopestyle - 6Star Burton European Open - Ticket to Ride (World Snowboard Tour)
7th - Halfpipe - 6Star Burton European Open - Ticket to Ride (World Snowboard Tour)
4th - Slopestyle - 5Star Burton Canadian Open - Ticket to Ride (World Snowboard Tour)
3rd - Halfpipe - 5Star Burton Canadian Open - Ticket to Ride (World Snowboard Tour)
9th - Halfpipe - 6Star Burton US Open - Ticket to Ride (World Snowboard Tour)
12th - Slopestyle - 6Star Burton US Open - Ticket to Ride (World Snowboard Tour)
5th - Halfpipe - 6Star Roxy Chicken Jam - Ticket to Ride (World Snowboard Tour)
3rd - Slopestyle - 6Star Roxy Chicken Jam - Ticket to Ride (World Snowboard Tour)

References
 Official Swatch TTR profile
 

Norwegian female snowboarders
Snowboarders at the 2002 Winter Olympics
Snowboarders at the 2010 Winter Olympics
Olympic snowboarders of Norway
1979 births
Living people
Sportspeople from Trondheim